Cara Ashley Consuegra (born March 4, 1979) is the current head coach of the Charlotte 49ers women's basketball team.

Prior to becoming head coach, she spent 7 season as an assistant coach for the Marquette University women's basketball team.

Iowa statistics 

Source

Head coaching record

References 

1979 births
Living people
American women's basketball coaches
Basketball coaches from Maryland
Basketball players from Maryland
Charlotte 49ers women's basketball coaches
Iowa Hawkeyes women's basketball players
Marquette Golden Eagles women's basketball coaches
Point guards
Utah Starzz players